Rail is a given name and surname. Notable people with the name include:
Given name
Rail Malikov (born 1985), Azerbaijani football defender
Rail Rozakov (born 1981), Russian ice hockey defenceman
Rail Zaripov (born 1995), Russian football player

Surname
Joanes Rail (born 1958), Canadian handball player

See also
Jimmy Rayl (1941–2019), American basketball player